The Zirak is a tribal confederation of Durrani (Abdali) Pashtuns in Afghanistan and Pakistan.

Tribes
Among the tribes that form a part of the confederation are:
 Popalzai
 Achakzai
 Alikozai
 Barakzai
 Mastay
 Mohammadzai
 Alakozai

References

1